The following is a List of hospitals in Puerto Rico.

See also
List of hospitals in the United States
List of hospitals in Ponce, Puerto Rico

References

External links

Buildings and structures in Puerto Rico by type
Hospitals
Puerto Rico
Health in Puerto Rico
Puerto Rico